Włodzimierz Pietrzak (7 July 1913 – 22 August 1944) was a Polish poet and literary critic. He was active in the underground cultural life in occupied Poland, editing underground magazines. He took part and died in the Warsaw Uprising.

A literary award of PAX Association was named after him.

1913 births
1944 deaths
Polish literary critics
Resistance members killed by Nazi Germany
Warsaw Uprising insurgents
20th-century Polish poets
Polish civilians killed in World War II